Micropterix constantinella is a species of moth belonging to the family Micropterigidae. It was described by Heath in 1986. It is only known from Algeria, where it has been found near Skikda.

References

Micropterigidae
Moths described in 1986
Endemic fauna of Algeria
Moths of Africa